Veertaa is a 1993 Indian film directed by Shibu Mitra. The movie stars Sunny Deol, Prosenjit Chatterjee, Jaya Prada, Shantipriya, Neena Gupta, Shakti Kapoor, Prem Chopra in pivotal roles.

Plot
Balwant Roy (Pradeep Kumar) is a big industrialist. His daughter Uma (Neena Gupta) is married to Sunderlal's (Prem Chopra) elder son Raghuveer (Shakti Kapoor). Sunderlal is the managing director of the Roy Group of Industries. Balwant Roy's only son, Amar—nicknamed Munna (Prosenjit Chatterjee) loves his sister very much. Sunderlal is a greedy character whose intends to steal the property of Balwant Roy and kill Munna. He plots a conspiracy to finish off Munna. But a village boy, Mangal (Sunny Deol) saves Munna's life. Now both are living together and Mangal's mother (Seema Deo) feels happy because they love her very much. However, some people recognise Munna and take him back again to his father. Balwant Roy realises that his son's life is in danger and sends Munna to a foreign country along with his trusted employee-friend, Laxman Chacha (Ram Mohan).

After many years, Sunderlal and Raghuveer become restless and desperate to kill Balwant Roy. They lock up Uma (Neena Gupta) in a cell. Now young Munna returns home and takes charge of the entire business. Sunderlal informs Munna that his sister Uma is very much ailing and has gone to U.S.A for treatment. Munna calls his childhood friend Mangal and appoints him as the new managing director of his business. Here Mangal meets Shalu (Jaya Prada) who is the daughter of another industrialist, Jay Prakash (Satyen Kappu). In her childhood, Shalu's marriage was fixed with Munna. But now Shalu falls in love with Mangal and he too accepts her love. Munna does not mind it, because he himself is in love with a village girl Maina (Shantipriya) from his childhood days.

Sunderlal and Raghuveer plot many ideas to finish off Mangal and Munna. Once with the help of Munna's secretary Lili (Aruna Irani), they almost succeed in framing Mangal in a false rape and murder case.  A misunderstanding thus develops between Mangal and Shalu, who even agrees to marry Sunderlal's younger son Ranveer (Tej Sapru). Finally Mangal and Munna succeed in identifying the real culprits.

Cast
 Sunny Deol as Mangal Singh
 Jaya Prada as Shalu
 Prosenjit Chatterjee as Amar Rai / Munna
 Pradeep Kumar as Balwant Rai
 Prem Chopra as Sundarlal
 Shakti Kapoor as Raghuveer
 Tej Sapru as Ranveer
 Aruna Irani as Lily
 Harsh Vashisht as Young Mangal Singh
 Neena Gupta as Uma
 Satyen Kappu as Shalu's father
 Jagdarshan Samra as Mohan
 Asha Sharma as Shalu's Mother
 Seema Deo as Mangal's Mother
 Ram Mohan
 Jagdish Raj
 Sudhir as Mill Manager Mehta
 Viju Khote as Kallu Dada
 Tiku Talsania
 Rajan Haskar
 Brahmachari as Sevakram
 Birbal
 Gurbachan Singh

Soundtrack
Ajit Singh Deol wrote all songs.

References

External links
 

1993 films
1990s Hindi-language films
Films scored by Bappi Lahiri
Films directed by Shibu Mitra